Sensi Seeds or Sensi Seed Bank is a Dutch company based in Amsterdam which markets cannabis seeds.

History 
The company was founded in 1985. Sensi Seeds is the world's largest cannabis seed producer with the world's largest cannabis seed bank,

Sensi Seeds was founded by Ben Dronkers, who also founded Amsterdam's Hash, Marihuana & Hemp Museum.

References

External links 
 
 Die Geschichte von Sensi Seeds. drogen-info-berlin.de

Cannabis seed companies
Companies based in Amsterdam
Cannabis in the Netherlands
1985 in cannabis
Cannabis seed banks
Dutch companies established in 1985
Agriculture companies established in 1985